Cutipay River is a river in Valdivia municipality, southern Chile. Cutipay is often referred as an inlet of Valdivia River rather than a river. The water flow in Cutapay changes twice a day due to the tide in the Valdivia River.

See also
 List of rivers of Chile

Rivers of Chile
Rivers of Los Ríos Region